CKRW may refer to:

 CKRW-FM, a radio station (96.1 FM) licensed to Whitehorse, Yukon, Canada
 CKRW (AM), a radio retransmitter (610 AM) licensed to Whitehorse, Yukon, Canada